At least two frigates of the Imperial Russian Navy have been named Kamchatka:

  circumnavigated the globe between 1817 and 1819 under Captain Vasily Golovnin.
  a steam frigate, built in New York City in 1841. Made several long voyages under Captain (later Admiral) Johan Eberhard von Schantz.

References 

Ships of the Imperial Russian Navy
Russian Navy ship names